"Pennyroyal Tea" is a song by the American rock band Nirvana, written by vocalist and guitarist Kurt Cobain. It is the ninth track on the band's third and final studio album, In Utero, released in 1993. 

The song was due to be released as the third single from In Utero in April 1994, but the single was recalled following Cobain's death the same month. The single was re-released, on limited edition 7 inch vinyl, for Record Store Day in April 2014, and charted at number 1 on the Billboard Hot Singles Sales chart.

Origin and recording

Early history
According to Michael Azerrad's 1993 Nirvana biography, Come as You Are: The Story of Nirvana, "Pennyroyal Tea" was written by Cobain in 1990 in an Olympia, Washington apartment he shared with Nirvana drummer, Dave Grohl. "Dave and I were screwing around on a 4-track," Cobain explained, "and I wrote that song in about thirty seconds. And I sat down for like half-an-hour and wrote the lyrics and then we recorded it." 

"Pennyroyal Tea" was first performed live on April 17, 1991 at the OK Hotel in Seattle, Washington, the show at which Nirvana also debuted their breakthrough single, "Smells Like Teen Spirit". Footage of both songs from this performance was released on the DVD of the Nirvana rarities box set, With the Lights Out, in November 2004.

Two unfinished takes of the song, both lacking vocals, were recorded by Jack Endino on October 26, 1992, at Word of Mouth in Seattle, Washington.

In Utero

The final studio version of "Pennyroyal Tea" was recorded by Steve Albini at Pachyderm Studios in Cannon Falls, Minnesota, in February, 1993, and officially released on In Utero in September 1993. 

The song was first attempted on February 14, with the first take being an instrumental." In a 2013 interview for the audio series Spotify Landmark, Albini revealed that "Pennyroyal Tea" and the album's eventual first single, "Heart-Shaped Box", were the only two songs recorded during the sessions that required "more than a couple of takes", saying that both were "recorded several times in several aerations." Albini also explained that Grohl's bass drum was replaced on "Pennyroyal Tea", as well as "Dumb", with a small one "with a full-front head on it, so that it had a very sort of bouncy, jazzy sound, as opposed to the sort of more percussive, more hard rock sound on the rest of the record."

Cobain was ultimately dissatisfied with the recording, telling David Fricke in a 1993 Rolling Stone interview that the song "was not recorded right. There is something wrong with that. That should have been recorded like Nevermind, because I know that's a strong song, a hit single. We're toying with the idea of re-recording it or remixing it." 

The song was remixed by Scott Litt, who had remixed the singles "Heart-Shaped Box" and "All Apologies" prior to the album's release, on November 23, 1993 at Bad Animals in Seattle, Washington. This version appeared on the censored Wal-Mart and Kmart versions of In Utero, released in March 1994. It was also the mix used on the recalled "Pennyroyal Tea" single, and became widely available when it appeared on the band's first greatest hits compilation, Nirvana, in November 2002.

Post-In Utero

On November 18, 1993, Cobain performed a solo, acoustic version of the song during Nirvana's MTV Unplugged appearance at Sony Music Studios in New York City. 

A full band version, featuring second guitarist Pat Smear, was recorded in Paris, France on February 4, 1994, during Nirvana's appearance on the French television show, Nulle Part Ailleurs.

The band had planned to perform the song on the UK TV show Top of the Pops later in 1994, as revealed by the discovery of a Digital Audio Tape containing three instrumental mixes of the song. The show allowed musicians to mime live vocals over pre-recorded instruments, and first featured Nirvana in November 1991, when Cobain mocked the show's format by singing "Smells Like Teen Spirit" in a lower key.

"Pennyroyal Tea" was performed for the last time live at Nirvana's final concert, on March 1, 1994, at Terminal Eins in Munich, Germany.

Composition and lyrics

The song's title refers to the tea made from boiling the leaves of the plant Mentha pulegium, or pennyroyal, which is used as an abortifacient, among other things, in traditional medicine. In Cobain's unused liner notes for In Utero, published posthumously in Journals in 2002, the entry for "Pennyroyal Tea" simply reads: "herbal abortive... it doesn't work, you hippie."

In an interview in the October 1993 issue of Impact, Cobain gave greater insight into the song, saying that it was about a person suffering from severe depression: 

In a 1995 interview, Cohen told Addicted to Noise correspondent Peter Howell, "I'm sorry I couldn't have spoken to the young man. I see a lot of people at the Zen Centre, who have gone through drugs and found a way out that is not just Sunday school. There are always alternatives, and I might have been able to lay something on him. Or maybe not."

Release

The "Pennyroyal Tea" single was recalled shortly after Cobain's death in April 1994. The single's cancellation may have been in part due to the title of one of the b-sides, "I Hate Myself and Want to Die", although it may have been cancelled regardless of this, so as not to capitalize on Cobain's death. In the United Kingdom, the single was scheduled to be released on May 3, 1994, but this was scrapped with Music Week reporting that sales of Nirvana releases had rocketed but that MCA did not want to cash-in on Cobain's death.

At the time, only retail versions of the CD single made in Germany had been manufactured and distributed. The singles were recalled and destroyed by the record label or retailers, but some copies were put aside, which is apparently the source of surviving copies. Some copies may have been sold by retailers, despite the recall. 

Sleeves for the single's United Kingdom release, on 7 inch vinyl and cassette, were manufactured, but the single itself was not pressed in the UK prior to the recall. As with all Nirvana artwork, it had been produced in the United States, although there were no plans to release the single in the US. However, the song did receive some airplay on US rock and alternative radio in 1994-95.

A promotional CD single for the song was manufactured in the UK and exists in even smaller numbers than the German retail CD. It features only the title track, misspelled as "Penny Royal Tea". In 2019, it was reported that the promotional single had appeared twice on Discogs with prices of $1,120 and $1,199.

In a March 2020 Goldmine article, journalist Gillian G. Garr reported a range of $346 to $1,100 as recent prices of the single, and "upwards of $1,000" for the promotional single, with one recently on sale for $2,597.

Single artwork

Unlike the artwork for the previous In Utero singles, "Heart-Shaped Box" and "All Apologies"/ "Rape Me", the artwork for the "Pennyroyal Tea" single featured no input from Cobain. "We got it done and I don't know that Kurt was around to approve it or not," recalls designer Robert Fisher. "I think it might just have been shot to management to approve or something." The single's cover features a teacup on a table next to a used ashtray, a cream pitcher and animal crackers.

Critical reception

Reviewing In Utero for Rolling Stone, Fricke wrote, "In the sepulchral folk intro of 'Penny Royal Tea,' Cobain almost sounds like Michael Stipe at the beginning of R.E.M.'s Drive'—before the heaving, fuzz-burnt chorus comes lashing down with a vengeance." In his review of the album for the NME, John Mulvey wrote that "Pennyroyal Tea" was "a terrific song – straightforward, insidious, oddly moving," but that "the guitars don't scream enough, the chorus doesn't tower like it should, and overall it's the one real 'Call Butch Vig' moment."

Legacy

In 2004, the NME ranked "Pennyroyal Tea" at number six on their list of the 20 Greatest Nirvana Songs Ever. The same year, Q included the song on their list of 12 Album Tracks That Should Have Been Singles, But Weren't, at number two. In 2015, Rolling Stone placed it at number 11 on their ranking of 102 Nirvana songs.

2014 Record Store Day re-release
On April 19, 2014, the "Pennyroyal Tea" single was re-released on 7-inch vinyl for Record Store Day 2014, limited to only 6000 copies. It was the top-selling vinyl single of Record Store Day in the US, reaching number 1 on the Billboard Hot 100 Singles Sales Chart.

Music video
Dutch director Anton Corbijn was asked to direct a music video for "Pennyroyal Tea", but he refused, saying he did not believe he could make a video better than the one he had made for "Heart-Shaped Box", the first single from In Utero. American director Jeffery Plansker was enlisted as the director instead, but the planned video was abandoned after Cobain's death in April 1994.

MTV Unplugged version

Featuring only Cobain on vocals and guitar, the MTV Unplugged version of "Pennyroyal Tea" was the only solo performance of the concert. The band had tried different approaches to the song during the rehearsal earlier that day, performing it in a different key and with Smear on backing vocals. However, during the show Cobain decided to attempt it on his own, asking, "Am I going to do this by myself?" to which Grohl replied, "Do it by yourself", and Cobain joking that "if it sounds bad, these people are just going to have to wait." The song was performed in the same arrangement as the In Utero version but without the guitar solo, and Cobain paused before the third verse, as if briefly forgetting what lyric to sing next, then regained himself and completed the song. Cobain biographer Charles Cross called this version Cobain's "single greatest moment onstage", writing that "like all the high-water marks of his career, it came at a time when he seemed destined to fail."

This version was officially released on the album MTV Unplugged in New York in November 1994. Footage of the performance, as well as from the rehearsals, were released on the MTV Unplugged in New York DVD in November, 2007.

Accolades

Track listings
All songs written and composed by Kurt Cobain unless otherwise noted.

1994 German CD single (GED 21907)
"Pennyroyal Tea" (Litt remix)
"I Hate Myself and Want to Die"
"Where Did You Sleep Last Night (In the Pines)" (live) (Traditional) (Edit)

1994 UK promotional CD single (NIRPRO)
"Pennyroyal Tea" (Litt remix)

1994 UK CD single (planned but never produced apart from the inserts)
"Pennyroyal Tea" (Litt remix)
"I Hate Myself and Want to Die"
"Where Did You Sleep Last Night (In the Pines)" (live) (Traditional)

1994 UK cassette single (planned but never produced)
"Pennyroyal Tea" (Litt remix)
"Where Did You Sleep Last Night (In the Pines)" (live) (Traditional)

1994 UK 7" vinyl single (planned but never produced apart from the card sleeves)
"Pennyroyal Tea" (Litt remix)
"Where Did You Sleep Last Night (In the Pines)" (live) (Traditional)

2014 Record Store Day 7" vinyl single re-release
"Pennyroyal Tea" (Litt remix)
"I Hate Myself and Want to Die"

Chart positions

Personnel
All personnel credits adapted from In Uteros liner notes except design personnel adapted from "Pennyroyal Tea"'s liner notes.

Nirvana
Kurt Cobain – vocals, guitar
Krist Novoselic – bass
Dave Grohl – drums

Production personnel
Steve Albini – producer, engineer
Adam Kasper – engineer
Scott Litt – mixing
Bob Ludwig – mastering

Design personnel
Robert Fisher – art direction, design
Greg Stata – art direction, design
John Skalicky – photography

Other releases

The second of the two instrumental takes recorded at Word of Mouth in Seattle, on October 26, 1992, was released on the 20th anniversary "Deluxe" and "Super Deluxe" versions of In Utero in September 2013.

A third mix of the studio version, done by Albini in 2013, also appeared the 20th anniversary "Deluxe" and "Super Deluxe" versions of In Utero.

A live version, recorded at Pier 48 in Seattle, on December 13, 1993 for MTV, was released on the live video, Live and Loud, in September 2013. An edited version of the concert, including "Pennyroyal Tea", first aired on MTV on December 31, 1993. The Live and Loud DVD also featured rehearsal footage of the song for the show, recorded earlier that day at the same venue, as bonus material.

The live version recorded during the band's appearance on Nulle Part Ailleurs in Paris, on February 4, 1994, appeared as bonus material on the Live and Loud DVD.

Unreleased versions

The 4-track version recorded by Cobain and Grohl in Olympia in 1990 was leaked on the internet in 2015, but has never appeared on an official release. Michelle Geslani of Consequence of Sound described this recording as "darker [and] more slow-burning" than the final studio version, and wrote that it "features Cobain adapting a guttural growl not unlike Leonard Cohen (interesting, given the lyrics)."

References
Bibliography

References

External links

"Pennyroyal Tea" single information at 
"Pennyroyal Tea" discography at 

1993 songs
1994 singles
Nirvana (band) songs
Songs written by Kurt Cobain
Songs about depression
Songs about drugs
Song recordings produced by Steve Albini
Record Store Day releases
Recalled publications